Belka may refer to:

People 
Ivan Fedorovich Belka Otyaev, 15th century Russian noble
Marek Belka (born 1952), former Prime Minister of Poland

Other uses 
Belka, one of the Soviet space dogs
Belka, Western Australia, a town
BelKA, a failed 2006 Belarusian satellite
Belka, a prominent fictional country in the Ace Combat video game franchise

See also
Bilka (disambiguation)
Belaka
Belca